The music of Saudi Arabia includes both Western and traditional music. The most distinguished musician in recent Saudi history is Tariq Abdulhakeem, who composed hundreds of famous Saudi songs for himself as well as for other singers; Saraj Omar has become a very prominent composer after writing the music for the Saudi national anthem; Mohammed Abdu, the most famous singer in the Arab World; Talal Maddah who died in August 2000 while singing in the summer festival on the stage of Al-Muftaha Theatre in the southern region of Saudi Arabia. The 1st Arab Pioneers Festival, which was held in Cairo under the patronage of the Arab League, honored four of the lead composers in Saudi Arabia: Tariq Abdulhakeem, Ghazi Ali, Mohamed Alsenan, and Mohammed Shafiq. Of the same generation are the oud virtuoso Abadi al Johar, Rabeh Saqer and Abdul-Majeed Abdullah.

Overview
Saudi traditional music is quite limited. However, the migratory lifestyle of the bedouin militated against carrying excess baggage, including musical instruments. Simple rhythms, with the beat counted by clapping or striking together everyday implements formed the basis of the music. Instruments like the double-reeded ney or the stringed rababa were sometimes used, after being obtained in cosmopolitan cities such as Jeddah.

However, music is considered "sinful" or "haram" by Wahhabi Muslims, including Salah Al Budair who is the Imam of the Grand mosque in Medina. This is based in part on certain Ahadith which speak negatively of non-percussion musical instruments and the idea that music and art are distractions from God. Some Muslims also believe it is sinful for songs to make any mention of women and for women to be involved in the composition of music. Particularly in the early days of the current Saudi state, religious authorities were quick to repress music other than the rhythmic percussion that still dominates contemporary Saudi music.

Samri is a popular traditional music and dance in Najd Region.

Omar Basaad was chosen as the best Saudi DJ and Electronic Dance Music Producer in 2012, by Saudi Gazette. He became the first official Saudi EDM (Electronic Dance Music) producer to represent Saudi Arabia internationally.

Etab was the first female singer from Saudi Arabia.

Dance

Ardah
Ardah, a type of folkloric dance, is the most popular dance in Saudi Arabia. It is performed with two rows of men opposite of one another, each of whom may or may not be wielding a sword or cane, and is accompanied by drums and spoken poetry.

Najdi ardah is the most common variant of ardah in Saudi Arabia. It is also the most practiced and highly televised male folkloric dance in the entire country. The Saudi government changed its name to 'Saudi ardah' in the 21st century. However, there are numerous variations of ardah distinct from Najdi ardah throughout the country, notably in the regions of Najran, Asir and Jizan.

Rock/metal music
Rock and metal artists from Saudi Arabia include:

Music institutions
Pursuant to the order of the Saudi Crown Prince, the first music teaching institute was established in Riyadh in 2019. The Institute was launched by the Egyptian violinist Mahmoud Sorour. Sorour plans to train around 50 violinists to enable them to perform in Jeddah opera house that is planned to be launched in 2022.

Notes and references

Sources
 Urkevich, Lisa (2015). Music and Traditions of the Arabian Peninsula: Saudi Arabia, Kuwait, Bahrain, and Qatar. New York: Routledge
 Badley, Bill (2000). "Sounds of the Arabian Peninsula". In Broughton, Simon and Ellingham, Mark with McConnachie, James and Duane, Orla (Ed.), World Music, Vol. 1: Africa, Europe and the Middle East, pp 351–354. Rough Guides Ltd, Penguin Books.

External links

 Saudi Music Examples
 Music and Traditions of the Arabian Peninsula: Saudi Arabia, Kuwait, Bahrain, and Qatar by L. Urkevich. New York: Routledge, 2015.
  Audio clip: traditional Saudi Arabian music. Musée d'ethnographie de Genève. Accessed November 25, 2010.
Saudi Arabia Rock and Metal Society.

 
Music
Music